Australsecodes is a genus of hymenopteran insects of the family Eulophidae.

References
Key to Nearctic eulophid genera
Universal Chalcidoidea Database

Eulophidae
Taxa named by Alexandre Arsène Girault